Dusty Rhodes Field at Harmon Stadium, generally known as Harmon Stadium, is the baseball stadium at the University of North Florida (UNF), and the home field of the North Florida Ospreys baseball team. It is located on the university's campus in Jacksonville, Florida, near the softball complex and aquatic center. It opened in 1988 and has a seating capacity of 1,250. The stadium is named for Doug and Linda Harmon for their contributions to constructions costs, while the field is named after UNF's first baseball coach, Dusty Rhodes.

Features
The "James J. Patton Osprey Nest" is an enclosed seating area for 100 people with kitchen facilities, restrooms, and the Osprey Baseball "Wall of Fame". The "Dusty Rhodes Batting Facility" is a covered training facility with hitting cages, pitching machines, and several indoor pitching mounds.

See also
 List of NCAA Division I baseball venues

References

Sports venues in Jacksonville, Florida
Baseball venues in Florida
College baseball venues in the United States
North Florida Ospreys baseball
1988 establishments in Florida
Sports venues completed in 1988